Asuka may refer to:

People
 Asuka (name), a list of people
 Asuka (wrestler), professional wrestler
 Asuka (wrestler, born 1998), professional wrestler also known as Veny outside of Japan

Places

In Japan
 , an area in Yamato Province (now Nara Prefecture) in Japan, where imperial palaces and centers of government were built in the 6th and 7th centuries
 , a village in Nara Prefecture in Japan, in the same area as ancient 
 , a park in Kita, Tokyo, Japan

Outside of Japan
 Asuka, Estonia, a village in Saaremaa Parish, Saare County, Estonia
 Asuka Station (Antarctica)

Ships
  (now MS Amadea), a cruise ship operated by Nippon Yusen Kaisha from 1991 to 2006
 , a cruise ship operated by Nippon Yusen Kaisha from 2006 onwards
 , an experimental ship of the Japan Maritime Self-Defense Force commissioned in 1995

Popular media
 Asuka (album), by the traditional/pop-rock group Rin'
 Asuka (magazine), a Japanese  manga magazine published by Kadokawa

Fictional entities
 Asuka Clan, a group of ninja in the Shinobido video game series
 Asuka Kudō, a character from Problem Children Are Coming from Another World, Aren't They?
 Asuka Mizunokoji, a character from the manga series Urusei Yatsura
 Asuka Langley Soryu, a character from the Neon Genesis Evangelion franchise

Other uses
 , a Japanese era from 538 to 710 AD
 ASTRO-D/ASCA (Asuka), satellite launched on 20 February 1993
 Asuka, a subsidiary of the French manga publisher Kazé

See also
 Aska (disambiguation)
 Capital of Japan